Roger Bush OBE (1918–2000) was a British-born Australian Methodist minister and media personality.

Early life
Bush was born in England and his family migrated to Sydney, Australia, the following year. He was the oldest of a family of four and had two brothers and a sister.

Family and BHP
He met his wife, Glenyce, in Norfolk whilst serving with the Royal Australian Air Force during World War II. After the war, they returned to Sydney and had two children, Peter and Lesley. Bush was employed by BHP at Wollongong before being ordained as a minister.

Methodist minister
He became an early talkback radio minister on Connections, a three-hour talkback program he devised and hosted on 2CH. Bush wrote a column for the Sydney Sun newspaper for 12 years. From the opening of the Sydney Opera House in 1973 he was responsible for the Christmas program of celebrations.

Retirement
In 1989, Bush retired to Port Macquarie.

Honours
 Port Macquarie Airport Memorial – 2001 Air Force Association 
 Officer – Order of the British Empire 1981 for service to the community
 Member – Order of the British Empire 1973 for service to the community

Publications
 The Open Line Bedside Book – (Sydney, 1984)
 The Origins of Christmas: Fact, Fiction and Myth – Reed Publishing (Sydney, 1982) 
 The Origins of Easter: Fact, Fiction and Myth – Reed Publishing (Sydney, 1982)
 A Bush Christmas – Rigby (Sydney, 1980)
 All the trees were green – Rigby (Adelaide, 1979)
 Prayers for Pagans – Hodder & Stoughton (Sydney, 1968)

References

1918 births
2000 deaths
Australian Methodists
Methodist ministers
Officers of the Order of the British Empire
Royal Australian Air Force personnel of World War II